Jun T. Lai (born 1953) is a Taiwanese artist, her practice includes sculpture, painting, public art, and other fields.

Life

Youth 
Jun T. Lai was born to an intellectual family in Taipei, where she learned about music, dance, and painting in her childhood. She graduated from the Department of Art, Chinese Culture University in 1974. During her study at Chinese Culture University, and inspired by Liao Chi-chun, Lai followed Henri Matisse works and Fauvism style. She received an MA degree from Tama Art University, Japan. She participated in several artist exchange programs in the US, France, and Switzerland.

Contemporary art studio 
Jun T. Lai moved back to Taiwan after the opening of Taipei Fine Arts Museum in 1983. At the same time, Taiwanese artist Lin Show Yu, based in Britain, also returned and held a solo exhibition. The conceptual art and minimal art tendencies exhibited during the show inspired Lai. In 1986, Jun T. Lai, Tsong Pu, and Zhang Yongcun established SOCA Contemporary Art Studio which is located in one of Lai's property in Taipei. The studio was used for art practice and exhibitions. Before the establishment of official organizations such as Ministry of Culture (Taiwan) and National Culture and Arts Foundation (Taiwan), Lai was attempting to make a vital declaration that every artist should be able to hold their exhibition independently without any form of inspection or approval. Simultaneously, she held art courses, participated lively in international art communities, founded SOCA rookie awards, worked on art related education and promotion projects. By the mid to late 1980s, Lai's works were exhibited in major public museums and major art museums in Taiwan.

Artistic practice 
Jun T. Lai, as a part of a group of female artists, uses her work to criticize the social norm which emphasizes the artist's female identity. In 1980s, She focused on materials of sculptures to present the piece and convey ideas. She is known for utilizing geometries to create sculptures.

The following are images of her works from Wikimedia Commons:

External links 

 Jun T. Lai Studio
 Taiwan Contemporary Art Archive – Jun T. Lai

References 

Taiwanese sculptors
Taiwanese contemporary artists
Feminist artists
1963 births
Living people
Chinese Culture University alumni